Miron Yanovich Fyodorov (born 31 January 1985), known by the stage name Oxxxymiron, is a Russian hip-hop artist and former CEO of the Booking Machine booking agency, as well as a co-founder and former member of the record label Vagabund.

Biography 
Miron Yanovich Fyodorov was born on 31 January 1985 in Leningrad, in a family of Russian Jews. His father is a theoretical physicist of the Konstantinov Institute of Nuclear Physics in St. Petersburg and his mother is a librarian. In St. Peterburg Miron attended secondary school No. 185. When Fyodorov was 9 years old, his family emigrated to Essen, Germany. During his studies in Maria Wächtler School, Miron had a 'tense relationship' with his classmates because of his social standing and poor German. At the age of 13, Fyodorov began to write lyrics and rap in German and Russian under the name MC Mif (from Miron Fyodorov). When he was 15, the Fyodorovs moved to Slough, United Kingdom. In 2004, Miron Fyodorov began studying at the University of Oxford in the faculty of English. During his studies Fyodorov was the  president of the Russian community of Oxford. In 2006 he was diagnosed with bipolar disorder and had to stop studying, however he managed to continue studying after a break. In June 2008 he graduated from the university with a degree in Middle English literature. 

After university, Fyodorov moved to the East End where he restarted his musical career under the name Oxxxymiron. The name is derived from his first name Miron, rhetorical device oxymoron and triple X, representing the large amount of profanity in his lyrics. He was not able to find a job because of his perceived overqualification and had to work as a cashier, a translator, a loader, a guide, a stallman, a tutor, an MC and an office clerk. Fyodorov's life in London formed the basis of the script of the Russian 2015 TV series Londongrad.

Optik Russia (2008–2010) 
In 2008, after a seven-year break, Oxxxymiron published a new track London Against All. In the same year he joined a German label Optik Russia where he met Dimitri Hinter, known by his stage name . In 2008 Oxxxymiron published his first music video, I'm a Hater.

In 2009 Oxxxymiron participated in the 14th independent battle on Hip-Hop.ru and reached the semi-finals. One of the main intrigues of the battle was the correspondence confrontation of Oxxxymiron and underground anonymous rapper , which was expressed in mutual disses against each other in the tracks of both performers. However, due to the departure of Miron after the 8th round, the face-to-face confrontation between them never took place. At the end of the year Oxxxymiron won several nominations (the Best Battle MC, the Breakthrough of the Battle, the Best Sparring of the Battle, the Best Track of the Battle) in the Hip-Hop.ru Awards 2009 public voting and also became the Invention of 2009.

On 26 and 31 July of the same year, Miron's first concerts took place in Kyiv and Odessa. In August 2010 Oxxxymiron and Schokk left Optik Russia.

Vagabund (2011) 
In autumn 2010 Oxxxymiron and Schokk toured countries of CIS. In a year, Oxxxymiron, Schokk and manager Ivan Karoy aka Vanya Lenin founded an independent label Vagabund (Vagabond in German). On 15 September 2011, Vagabund published Fyodorov's first album , which received a lot of positive reviews. On 30 October 2011 Vagabund gave their last concert. On 1 November 2011 Oxxxymiron left Vagabund due to conflict between the members of the label and Moscow rapper Roma Zhigan. On 6 November he gave a free a cappella concert in Moscow and moved back to London.

miXXXtape (2012–2014) 

On 12 March 2012 Oxxxymiron published miXXXtape I which includes the best tracks recorded from 2008 to 2011. On 18 October 2013 miXXXtape II: Long way home was published. It included the best tracks of 2012-2013 and remixed Oxxxymiron's bars from his battle against Krip-a-Krip in Versus Battle league. On 8 August 2014 Oxxxymiron extended the deadline of the release of his second album for an indefinite period despite it having been planned to be released on 14 August 2014.

Gorgorod (2015–2016) 
On 25 August 2015 music video  Londongrad was published as a teaser trailer for TV series Londongrad based on Miron's life in London before restarting his rapper career. On 21 September Oxxxymiron published the music video City under the Sole which was watched 2 million times in a week.

On 13 November 2015 Oxxxymiron released his second album, Gorgorod which became the most popular Russian music album of 2015.

In 2017 Oxxxymiron became CEO of the Booking Machine (BM) booking agency.

On 28 June 2016 Oxxxymiron became the first ambassador of Reebok Classic in Russia.

2017–present 

On 28 September 2017 it was announced that Oxxxymiron will star in the film adaptation of Victor Pelevin’s novel Empire V. The film's director is Victor Ginzburg, famous for the screen version of the novel Generation "П". In 2021 Oxxxymiron also portrayed composer Nikolai Rubinstein in Kirill Serebrennikov's Tchaikovsky's wife.

In August 2019 Oxxxymiron left his CEO position in Booking Machine agency.

In September 2019, Oxxxymiron unexpectedly took part in the 17th Independent Battle on Hip-Hop.ru and passed the track for the first qualifying round. After that, a certain wave of excitement began around the event, and many famous hip-hop artists also participated (Egor Kreed, Noize MC, L'One, ST1M, Yury Khovansky, etc.). On 2 March 2020 Oxxxymiron announced his rejection from the 5th round of the battle on Twitter.

On 1 November 2021 Oxxxymiron published a ten-minute-long music video Who killed Mark?. On 12 November Fyodorov's third mixtape, miXXXtape III: Time of Troubles, was released. It included 36 songs from 2014 to 2021 and two new tracks among them. The nine-minute single Who killed Mark?, which preceded the release of the mixtape, was not included in the playlist of the record. On 1 December 2021 Oxxxymiron released his third album Beauty & Ugliness which included 22 new songs including collaborations with Russian singer Tosia Chaikina, Estonian rapper Tommy Cash, Russian rappers Dolphin,  and Igla and Russian electronic hip-hop duo AIGEL. The album cover was made by one of the founding fathers of Russian rock music Boris Grebenshchikov.

In reaction to the 2022 Russian invasion of Ukraine, Oxxxymiron called for an anti-war movement, stating, "I know that most people in Russia are against this war, and I am confident that the more people would talk about their real attitude to it, the faster we can stop this horror." He cancelled six sold-out concerts in Moscow and St. Petersburg, stating, "I cannot entertain you when Russian missiles are falling on Ukraine. When residents of Kyiv are forced to hide in basements and in the metro, while people are dying." He later said that it was impossible to hold an anti-war concert in Russia because "total censorship has been implemented, and anyone who speaks out against the war in any way becomes a potential target for criminal prosecution." He went on to announce a series of benefit concerts in other countries, entitled "Russians Against War", the proceeds from which would be donated to NGOs helping Ukrainian refugees. The first of these concerts was held in Istanbul, which has a large Russian diaspora consisting of people who left the country in protest of the invasion. The other two concerts were held in London and Berlin. In September, he returned to Russia; the next month, the Russian justice ministry added him to the list of foreign agents.

Battle rap 
Oxxxymiron is the most viewed battle rapper in the world. Amount of views of his rap battles exceed 120 million on YouTube.

Oxxxymiron participated in the Russian battle rap league Versus Battle five times and won the first four of them.

 2013 – Oxxxymiron vs. Krip-a-Krip (3:0)
 2014 – Oxxxymiron vs. Dunya (won by vote of crowd)
 2015 – Oxxxymiron vs. Johnyboy (5:0). This battle was watched 1 million times during one day and became the most popular battle in the world. Oxxxymiron and Versus Battle league attracted the King of the Dot host Organik's and Dizaster's attention.
 2016 – Oxxxymiron vs. [[ST] (rapper)|ST] (3:0). This battle was watched 4 million times during one day.
 2017 – Oxxxymiron vs. Slava KPSS (Versus Battle x #SLOVOSPB) (0:5). This battle was watched over 9 million times during the fist day and has become one of the most watched battles in the world.

Also Oxxxymiron performed at the Canadian rap battle league King of the Dot:

 2017 – Oxxxymiron vs. Dizaster is scheduled as a Main Event for King of the Dot's World Domination 7 event (without judges). This battle became highest viewed on YouTube channel King of the Dot. Oxxxymiron after the battle with Dizaster thanked Slava KPSS for an opportunity to work on the mistakes. According to him, if not for that rap-battle in August, there would not have been such a historical rap-battle in October against Dizaster.

Discography

Albums 
 2011 –  (Вечный жид)
 2015 –  (Горгород)
 2021 –  (Красота и Уродство)

Mixtapes 
 2012 – miXXXtape I
 2013 – miXXXtape II: A Long Way Home (miXXXtape II: Долгий путь домой)
 2021 – miXXXtape III: Time of Troubles (miXXXtape III: Смутное время)

Singles 
 2011 – Feast Today and Fast Tomorrow feat. Schokk (То густо, то пусто)
 2011 – East Mordor (Восточный Мордор)
 2011 – Hello from the Bottom feat. dom!No (Привет со дна)
 2011 – My Mentality (Мой менталитет)
 2011 – Russky Cockney
 2012 – Roly-poly Toy (Неваляшка)
 2012 – Ultima Thule feat. Luperkal
 2013 – Darkside feat. Madchild
 2015 – HPL
 2015 – Londongrad (Лондонград)
 2015 – City under Sole (Город под подошвой)
 2017 – Bipolar (Биполярочка)
 2018 – Konstrukt feat. Porchy, May Wave$, Jeembo, Loqiemean, Thomas Mraz, Tveth, Souloud, Markul
 2019 – In the rain feat. Djino
 2019 – Reality feat. Piem, J.Makonnen, Dinast, LeTai, Palmdropov
 2021 – Who killed Mark? (Кто убил Марка?)
 2022 – Oyda (Ойда)
 2022 – Made in Russia (Сделано в России)

Singles (as a guest artist) 
 2014 – Earth Burns (Porchy feat. Oxxxymiron)
 2014 – I'm Bored with Life (LSP feat. Oxxxymiron) (Мне скучно жить)
 2015 – Breathless (Jacques Anthony feat. Oxxxymiron) (Бездыханным)
 2017 – Fata Morgana (Markul feat. Oxxxymiron)
 2018 – Gorsvet (Loqiemean feat. Oxxxymiron) (Горсвет)
 2018 – Stereocoma (Thomas Mraz feat. Oxxxymiron)
 2018 – Tabasco (Porchy feat. Oxxxymiron)
 2021 – A tale of lost time (Rudeboi's single) (Сказка о потерянном времени)

Guest appearance 
 2008 – Rudeboi Mixtape (Ganz's mixtape)
 2008 – II level\Download or die (Dandy's mixtape) (II уровень\Скачай или умри)
 2008 – 4 Me Dogs (At-Side's mixtape)
 2008 – Gemischte Tüte (Twi$terBeats' album)
 2009 – Mixtape King Vol. 2 (SD's mixtape)
 2009 – New Beef on the Block (Schokk's mixtape)
 2009 – Emancipation EP (Jahna Sebastian's EP)
 2010 – Chronicles of London (Tribe's mixtape) (Хроники Лондона)
 2010 – Schizzo (Schokk's mixtape)
 2011 – Retrospective (Grozny's album)
 2011 – Operation Payback (Schokk's mini tape)
 2011 – From the Big Road (Schokk's album) (С большой дороги)
 2011 – Measured Rap (Markul's mixtape)
 2013 – Brooklyn Dubz (I1's mini tape)
 2015 – On Real Events (Rigos' & Bluntcath's album) (На реальных событиях)
 2015 – Magic City (LSP's album)
 2015 – Breathless (Jacques Anthony's album) (Бездыханным)
 2016 – King Midas (Porchy's mixtape)
 2016 – My Little Dead Boy (Loqiemean's album)
 2017 – Horizon of Events (Bi-2's album) (Горизонт событий)
 2017 – Terrarium (Ka-tet's EP) (Террариум)
 2019 – The Fall (Porchy's album)
 2019 – Mongolia (Gino's album)
 2020 – Tales from the Crypt (25/17's album) (Байки из склепа)
 2021 – Aghori (Kool Savas's album)

Music videos 
 2008 – I'm a Hater (Я хейтер)
 2011 – Feast Today and Fast Tomorrow feat. Schokk (То густо, то пусто)
 2011 – Russky Cockney
 2011 – Still Water feat. Markul (В тихом омуте)
 2012 – Gremlin's Little Song (Песенка Гремлина)
 2012 – Lie Detector (Детектор лжи)
 2012 – Otherworldly (Не от мира сего)
 2012 – Life Signs (Признаки жизни)
 2013 – XXX Shop feat. Chronz, Porchy
 2013 – Bigger Ben feat. OHRA (Больше Бена)
 2013 – Chitinous Carapace (Хитиновый покров)
 2013 – Drake Passage (Пролив Дрейка)
 2013 – Honestly (I1 feat. Oxxxymiron) (Честно)
 2015 – Deja vu (Rigos feat. Oxxxymiron) (Дежавю)
 2015 – Roly-poly toy, unpublished video filmed in 2012 (Неваляшка)
 2015 – Madness (LSP feat. Oxxxymiron) (Безумие)
 2015 – Londongrad (Лондонград)
 2015 – City under Sole (Город под подошвой)
 2017 – IMPERIVM
 2017 – Fata Morgana (Markul feat. Oxxxymiron)
 2017 – Time to Go Home (Bi-2 feat. Oxxxymiron) (Пора возвращаться домой)
 2017 – Progress Engine (Ka-tet feat. Oxxxymiron) (Машина прогресса)
 2018 – Breathless, unpublished video filmed in 2015 (Jacques Anthony feat. Oxxxymiron) (Бездыханным)
 2018 – Konstrukt feat. Porchy, May Wave$, Jeembo, Loqiemean, Thomas Mraz, Tveth, Souloud, Markul
 2019 – Reality feat. Piem, J.Makonnen, Dinast, LeTai, Palmdropov
 2021 – Verses on the Unknown Soldier, a hip-hop adaptation of Osip Mandelstam's poem of the same title (Стихи о неизвестном солдате)
 2021 – Who killed Mark? (Кто убил Марка?)
 2021 – Tsunami (Цунами)
 2021 – Organization (Организация)
 2021 – Moss (Мох)
 2022 – Oyda (Ойда)

Filmography

Concert tours 
 2009 – Unnamed feat. Schokk
 2010 – October Events feat. Schokk (Октябрьские события)
 2011 – Vagabund Tour feat. Schokk
 2012 – Unnamed
 2013 – Roly-poly toy VS Mordor (Неваляшка VS Мордор Tour) 
 2013 – Long Way Home (Долгий путь домой)
 2014 – arXXXeology (арХХХеология Tour)
 2015 – City under Sole (Город под подошвой Tour)
 2016 – Takeover Tour
 2016 – Back to Europe
 2016 – Takeover Tour 2
 2017 – IMPERIVM (stadium tour)
 2022 – Russians Against War

Book editions

References

External links 
 

1985 births
Living people
Jewish rappers
Russian hip hop musicians
Alumni of Balliol College, Oxford
Grime music artists
British people of Russian-Jewish descent
Rappers from Saint Petersburg
Russian activists against the 2022 Russian invasion of Ukraine
People with bipolar disorder
Russian emigrants to Germany
Russian emigrants to the United Kingdom
Russian people of Jewish descent
People listed in Russia as foreign agents